The May Bumps 2021 were a set of rowing races at Cambridge University scheduled to take place from Wednesday 16 June 2021 to Saturday 19 June 2021.  The event was to be run as a bumps race and would have been the 129th set of races in the series of May Bumps which had been held annually in mid-June since 1887. In this edition of the Mays, the women's divisions were due to be raced before the equivalent men's divisions.

As a result of the COVID-19 pandemic, the races were cancelled in mid-April, with a side-by-side regatta held in their place.

Cancellation 

On 4 January 2021, England's third national lockdown due to the COVID-19 pandemic was announced. Although students had returned to Cambridge following the gradual easing of measures throughout the spring of 2021 by the time the Mays were due to be held in June, CUCBC announced the cancellation of the races in mid-April. They cited the announcement by the University's Vice-Chancellor Stephen Toope that students would be unlikely to be able to return to the university en masse before Monday 17 May, leaving insufficient time available for the requisite twelve training outings that all crews competing in Bumps must have completed in preparation to ensure crew competence and safety. As an alternative, they suggested that a "non-contact rowing event" would allow more crews to complete safely given the relatively low level of experience in comparison to other years. An Eights Regatta was run by CUCBC in place of the cancelled Bumps races.

June Eights Regatta 

The June Eights Regatta which replaced the 2021 May Bumps took place over five days from Sunday 20 June 2021 to Thursday 24 June 2021. The first day of racing comprised the getting-on race which seeded the crews for the Swiss-style tournament that took place on the subsequent four days of the competition. Racing was held on a course of 1.1 kilometres in length on the Long Reach, with two boats racing side-by-side in each race. Each boat had the opportunity to participate in four races.

In total 154 crews were entered into the competition, of which the majority were women's crews - a historic first for a CUCBC-run event. However, due to an increase in COVID-19 cases among the student population in the days preceding the event, several crews were forced to withdraw before or during the competition.

Eight divisions were run in total, including first and second divisions for men's and women's senior and novice crews. The inclusion of novice divisions in a competition so late in the academic year is unusual but it was deemed appropriate given that student rowing had not been possible for much of the year due to the ongoing pandemic.

Cumulative results by division

Division 1 

  M1 won all four of their races to finish at the top of the men's first division.  M1,  M1,  M1 and  M1 all won three races,  M2,  M1,  M1,  M1,  M1 and  M1 won two races each and  M1,  M1,  M1 and  M1 all won one of their four races.  M1 was the only crew in the division to lose all four races.

  W1 won the women's first division, having won all four of their races.  W1,  W1,  W1 and  W1 each won three races,  W1,  W1,  W1,  W1,  W1 and  W1 won two races each and  W1,  W1,  W2 and  W2 won one race each, while  W1 won none of their races.

Division 2 

   M2 won a tiebreaker with  M2 to claim victory in the men's second division after both crews won all four of their races. Crews to win three races were  M1,  M1,  M1,  SX (the highest-ranked mixed crew) and  M2, while those who won two races each were  M2,  M2,  M3,  M3,  M1,  M2,  M2 and  M1. Meanwhile,  M2,  M1,  M1 and  M2 won one race each, and  SX and  M1 were left without any victories to claim.  M2 withdrew from the competition with no wins.

  W2 were victorious in the women's second division after their tiebreaker with  W1, each crew having won all four of their races.  W1,  W2,  W1,  W1 and  W2 won three races each,  W1,  W2,  W1,  W1,  W1,  W2,  W2 and  W3 won two races each and  W1,  W1,  W2,  W2 and  W2 each won one race.  W2 and  W2 both finished without any wins, and both  W1 and  W2 withdrew from the tournament.

Novice Division 1 

  NM1 won their division outright, with  NM1,  NM1,  NM1 and  NM1 each winning three of their races and  NM1,  NM1,  NM1,  NM1,  NM2 and  NM1 each winning two.  NM1,  NM1,  NM1 and  NM1 managed a single win each, while  NM1 lost all four races.

  NW1 were the victors of the women's first novice division, while  NW1,  NW1,  NW1 and  NW1 finished with three wins each and  NW1,  NW1,  NW1,  NW1,  NW1/2 and  NW1 with two each.  NW1,  NW1 and  NW1 each won one race, while  NW1 finished with no wins and  NW1 withdrew.

Novice Division 2 

 In a division comprising only nine boats,  NM2 came top of the leaderboard with four wins, followed by  NM2 with three  and  NM1 and  NM1 with two each.  NM2 won one race and  NM1 and  NM1 were beaten in all four races. Both  NM1 and  NM2 scratched.

  NW1 denied Caius a clean sweep in the women's divisions by winning all four of their races, closely followed by  NW2,  NW1 and  NW2 on three wins each.  NW2,  NW1,  NW1 and  NW1 won two races each, with  NW2 winning one and  NW3, the only third novice boat in the competition, losing all of their races. This division saw  NW2,  NW1,  NW1 and  NW1 all withdraw from the competition, with only  NW2 having won one race prior to their withdrawal.

Links to races in other years

See also 
Impact of the COVID-19 pandemic on sports
May Bumps 2020
Lent Bumps 2021

References 

2021 in rowing
May Bumps results
2021 in English sport
Sports events cancelled due to the COVID-19 pandemic